"Fatal Extraction" is the twelfth Christmas special episode of the BBC sitcom Only Fools and Horses, first broadcast on 25 December 1993. In the episode, Raquel leaves Del so in response he asks out another woman. When he and Raquel are reconciled, Del becomes convinced that the woman is stalking him.

Synopsis
With Christmas coming to Peckham, which is suffering from recent riots, Del Boy has been drinking every night at the Nag's Head as well as ending up with a sore tooth. Raquel is not pleased about it, since she hardly sees him now. Meanwhile, Rodney and Cassandra have decided to try to have a baby. At Sid's café, Del talks about the time he first met a woman at a betting shop in Lewisham Grove when he was younger.

Rodney catches Del gambling at the 1-2-1 Club one night, and Del explains that he is striking a deal with the club's owner Ronnie Nelson to get hold of some Russian Army camcorders to flog for Christmas. Rodney pleads with Del to spare a thought for Raquel, however the brothers eventually gamble all the way through the night until 8:00am the next morning, only to be told Ronnie was not in that night.

At the market, Del and Rodney are selling ski gear, until Cassandra calls Rodney back to their flat. Rodney is surprised when he finds Raquel and Damien in his flat. Raquel explains that she has left Del, and Rodney and Cassandra let her and Damien stay at their flat until Del apologises. Later, at The Nag's Head, Boycie, Del, Denzil, Mike and Trigger discuss their problems with women. Boycie then tells them about how he met a woman in the same betting shop when he was also younger, and it turns out to be Marlene (although it was established in earlier series that Marlene had attended school with Del and his friends when they were all younger). Albert then enters to inform Del that Raquel has left him. That afternoon, Rodney forces a reluctant Del to go to the dentist. The dentist is able to remove the bad tooth from Del's mouth. Del then arranges a date with an attractive receptionist named Beverly.

That night at Nelson Mandela House, the Russian camcorders have arrived, but Rodney discovers that they are too heavy and the video cassettes are too wide for UK VCRs. Del, dressed in his Gordon Gekko outfit, tells Rodney and Albert about his date with Beverly. They believe that Del is making a big mistake, and successfully talk him out of his date. Del cancels the date by leaving a message on Beverly's answering machine.

Later, back at his flat, Rodney tells Cassandra about the time Del had a violent fight with his father over Del selling Tom Jones LPs instead of attending his O-level school exams, which got him eight grade As (which all stood for Absent).

The next evening at the Nag's Head, after Albert tells another one of his boring war stories, Del enters, and Rodney berates him for ignoring Raquel. Del finally phones Raquel, apologises to her, and promises that he will stop gambling from now on, and they can still go to the Nag's Head on weekends. After he promises to pick up both her and Damien the following night, Del celebrates with a big bottle of champagne.

Later that night, Del returns home drunk from too much champagne, and decides to sing the song "One Voice", which starts a riot between some of the neighbours. Albert phones Rodney to tell him that Del is singing, and Rodney heads over to Nelson Mandela House. Del later goes down to the riot to sell some of the ski gear. The next morning at the market, while unloading the Russian VCRs, Del spots Beverly, who was in the Nag's Head the previous night, and becomes frightened she may be stalking him.

That night, Del picks up Raquel and Damien in the Capri Ghia, and they return home during another riot. Del beeps his horn, and the rioters and the police clear the way for him. He passes through, stopping to inform the occasional person about something they are buying off him, and when out of the way promptly sounds his horn, to which the riot resumes.

The following day, Del comes home from work, only to see Beverly in his flat, because she wants Damien's high chair for her grandson, who is also named Damien. Del rushes over to the Nag's Head to tell Rodney that Beverly is stalking him, because he believes she is an ex-patient in a psychiatric hospital (Boycie mentioned he had seen her there before when visiting Marlene's brother). Rodney does not believe him, but Del tells him to deliver the high chair to Beverly. At the dentist, Del finally decides to confront Beverly and tell her to leave him and his family alone, but Beverly tells Del that she thought he was stalking her, as well as mention that the date they arranged to go on was a big mistake. Beverly then explains to Del that she previously worked at the psychiatric hospital as a receptionist. No longer frightened, Del promises to leave Beverly alone.

Back at Nelson Mandela House, the Trotter family are enjoying their Christmas night. As Del puts Damien to bed, Raquel plugs in Del's new answering machine, which she acquired from Beverly in return for the high chair, only to hear Del's message about his cancelled date to Beverly. Del returns to the lounge, only to get hit by ornaments thrown by Raquel and the entire family end up in a huge argument. Meanwhile, outside by the new Christmas tree, a group of carol singers sing "Silent Night", and Beverly looks up at the Trotters' flat with a smile, implying that Del was right and she was out for revenge all along for cancelling their date.

Episode cast

Music
 Right Said Fred: "Hands Up"
 Elton John: "Step into Christmas"
 Paul Young: "Hope in a Hopeless World"
 Barry Manilow: "One Voice"
 Mica Paris: "Whisper a Prayer"
 East 17: "It's Alright"
 Carl Orff: "O Fortuna" from Carmina Burana
 Chaka Demus and Pliers: "Twist and Shout"
 Take That: "Babe"
 U2: "Stay (Faraway, So Close!)"
 Gustav Holst: "Mars, the Bringer of War"
 Wizzard: "I Wish It Could Be Christmas Everyday"

Note: In the VHS/DVD versions, Carl Orff's "O Fortuna" is replaced by a similar-sounding piece of music.

External links

1993 British television episodes
British Christmas television episodes
Only Fools and Horses special episodes